Diliberto is a surname. Notable people with the surname include:

Bernard "Buddy" Diliberto (1931–2005), American sports commentator
John Diliberto, American radio host and producer 
Oliviero Diliberto (born 1956), Italian politician
Silvio Diliberto (born 1963), Dutch football player